A Storm of Swords is the third of seven planned novels in A Song of Ice and Fire, a fantasy series by American author George R. R. Martin. It was first published on August 8, 2000, in the United Kingdom, with a United States edition following in November 2000. Its publication was preceded by a novella called Path of the Dragon, which collects some of the Daenerys Targaryen chapters from the novel into a single book.

At the time of its publication, A Storm of Swords was the longest novel in the series. It was so long that in the UK, Ireland, Australia, Serbia and Israel, its paperback edition was split in half, Part 1 being published as Steel and Snow in June 2001 (with the one-volume cover) and Part 2 as Blood and Gold in August 2001 (with a specially-commissioned new cover). The same division was used in the Polish and Greek editions. In France, the decision was made to cut the novel into four separate volumes.

A Storm of Swords won the 2001 Locus Award, the 2002 Geffen Award for Best Novel and was nominated for the 2001 Nebula Award for Best Novel. It was the first novel in the series to be nominated for the Hugo Award, one of the two most prestigious awards in science fiction and fantasy publishing, although it lost to J. K. Rowling's novel Harry Potter and the Goblet of Fire.

Meisha Merlin Publishing, which had previously issued limited, illustrated editions of both A Game of Thrones and A Clash of Kings, was planning to release a similar version for A Storm of Swords in two volumes; however, lengthy delays in the release of A Clash of Kings caused it to lose its publishing rights, which were picked up by Subterranean Press. This edition, illustrated by Charles Vess, was released in the summer of 2006.

A Storm of Swords is also the name of the second expansion to the board game A Game of Thrones, released in July 2006. Approximately the first half of the novel was adapted for television as the third season of the HBO show Game of Thrones, while the second half became the basis for the series' fourth season, and some elements for the series' fifth season.

Plot summary

A Storm of Swords picks up the story slightly before the end of its predecessor, A Clash of Kings. The Seven Kingdoms of Westeros are still in the grip of the War of the Five Kings, wherein Joffrey Baratheon and his uncle Stannis Baratheon compete for the Iron Throne, while Robb Stark of the North and Balon Greyjoy of the Iron Islands declare their independence (Stannis's brother Renly Baratheon, the fifth "king", has already been killed). Meanwhile, a large host of wildlings, the tribes from beyond the Seven Kingdoms' northern border, approach the Wall that marks the border, under the leadership of Mance Rayder, the self-proclaimed "King Beyond the Wall", with only the undermanned Night's Watch in opposition. Finally, Daenerys Targaryen, the daughter of a deposed former king of Westeros and "mother" of the world's only living dragons, sails west, planning to retake her late father's throne.

In the Seven Kingdoms

The Riverlands
At her father's castle of Riverrun, Robb's mother Catelyn Stark releases the captive Jaime Lannister, Joffrey's uncle (and, secretly, father) in order to secure the release of Catelyn's daughters, Sansa and Arya, who Catelyn believes are both being held hostage by the Lannisters in the capital city, King's Landing. Jaime is sent south, escorted by Brienne of Tarth. Robb's army returns to Riverrun, having vanquished the Lannister armies in the west, and Robb reveals that he has married Jeyne Westerling, violating his promise to be wed to a daughter of House Frey. These actions alienate and infuriate some of Robb's allies, weakening his military position.

Jaime and Brienne are captured by mercenaries working for Roose Bolton, who is nominally an ally of Robb's but is secretly plotting to undermine him to become Warden of the North. The mercenary captain Vargo Hoat has Jaime's sword hand cut off. Brienne is thrown into a bear pit by Hoat, and Jaime risks his own life to rescue her. Bolton releases Jaime and Brienne and they travel to King's Landing.

Arya Stark, traveling in the Riverlands, is taken in by the "Brotherhood Without Banners": a band that defends the smallfolk of the Riverlands, led by Lord Beric Dondarrion and the red priest Thoros of Myr. The group captures Sandor "The Hound" Clegane, Joffrey's former bodyguard, and offers him trial by combat for his crimes. The Hound kills Beric, but Thoros resurrects him with the power of the fire god R'hllor. The Hound kidnaps Arya and flees with her, planning to ransom her.

In order to return north to defend the region against Greyjoy attacks, Robb needs the support of the Freys. The Freys propose a wedding between Catelyn's brother Edmure Tully, now lord of the Riverlands, and one of Lord Walder Frey's daughters, to compensate for Robb breaking his marriage agreement. At the wedding celebration, the Boltons and Freys turn on the Starks, massacring Robb's bannermen. Robb is murdered by Roose Bolton, while Catelyn's throat is cut and her body thrown into the river; Edmure is kept alive as a hostage. These events become known as the Red Wedding.

Arya and the Hound witness the massacre and escape. Later, the Hound is wounded in a skirmish, and Arya abandons him. She takes a ship to the Free City of Braavos, where the assassin Jaqen H'ghar had told her she could find him.

In the epilogue, a re-animated but decayed and mutilated Catelyn is leading the Brotherhood Without Banners, and she oversees the lynching of two of the Freys who were present at the Red Wedding.

King's Landing, Dragonstone, and the Eyrie
The smuggler-turned-knight Davos Seaworth attempts to assassinate Stannis' advisor Melisandre, a sorceress and priestess of R'hllor, blaming her for Stannis' defeat in his prior assault on King's Landing. Davos is imprisoned for treason, but at Melisandre's behest, Stannis releases Davos and appoints him Hand of the King. Melisandre uses the blood of Edric Storm, a bastard son of Stannis' late brother King Robert, to curse the three rival Kings. Balon Greyjoy's death is reported shortly thereafter.

King's Landing welcomes the Lannisters' new allies, the Tyrells, as liberators, and King Joffrey sets aside his betrothal to Sansa Stark in favor of Margaery Tyrell. Joffrey's grandfather Tywin Lannister, the Hand of the King, compels Sansa to marry his dwarf son Tyrion, to enable Lannister control of the North; but Tyrion refuses to consummate the marriage against her will.

Margaery and Joffrey's wedding is held as planned, but during the wedding feast, Joffrey is poisoned and dies. Tyrion is accused of the murder by his sister Cersei, Joffrey's mother, and arrested.  Sansa escapes the castle with the help of Lord Petyr "Littlefinger" Baelish, who admits to her his culpability in Joffrey's death, incriminating Margaery's grandmother Olenna as well. Littlefinger and Sansa depart King's Landing for the Eyrie, home of Catelyn's sister Lysa Arryn.

After Balon, Robb and Joffrey die, as Melisandre predicted, Davos has Edric smuggled to safety to prevent Melisandre and Stannis sacrificing him for the power in his blood. Davos discovers a request by the Night's Watch for aid against Mance Rayder; Stannis prepares to execute Davos for treason but changes his mind after Davos shows Stannis the Night's Watch's plea.

The spymaster Varys and Tyrion's lover Shae testify falsely against Tyrion at his trial. Prince Oberyn Martell, of the southern region of Dorne, offers to represent Tyrion in a trial by combat against Cersei's champion, Gregor Clegane, who was responsible for the death of Oberyn's sister Elia. Oberyn nearly wins, but is ultimately killed by Gregor, although the poison on Oberyn's spear leaves Gregor dying in agony. Tyrion is sentenced to death.

Upon returning to King's Landing, Jaime gives Brienne a sword reforged from the hereditary sword of the Stark family, and sends her to find Arya and Sansa and return them home. Jaime refuses to believe that Tyrion killed Joffrey, and helps Varys free Tyrion from prison. Jaime reveals that Tyrion's first wife Tysha, whom Tywin had gang-raped by his garrison, was not a prostitute as Tywin told him, and genuinely loved Tyrion. Outraged, Tyrion swears revenge on Jaime, Cersei, and Tywin; during his escape, he murders both Shae and Tywin before fleeing Westeros.

At the Eyrie, Sansa is disguised as an illegitimate daughter of Littlefinger, and Littlefinger and Lysa are married. Lysa reveals that Littlefinger had convinced her to poison her late husband Jon, and to pin the blame on the Lannisters, which was the catalyst for the events of A Game of Thrones. Lysa threatens to kill Sansa, thinking she is trying to seduce Littlefinger, but Littlefinger intervenes and, after revealing that he had only ever loved Catelyn, pushes Lysa to her death.

The North
The detachment of the Night's Watch under Lord Commander Jeor Mormont are attacked by undead wights and the Others, hostile inhuman creatures from the far north. The Watch suffer heavy casualties, although the steward Samwell Tarly kills one of the Others with a blade of obsidian. Soon some of the Watch mutiny and kill Mormont, but Sam escapes with the help of a wildling girl, Gilly. Sam, Gilly, and Gilly's newborn child approach the Wall, assisted by a strange figure riding an elk, whom Sam calls Coldhands. Among the dead are most of the Watch's senior leadership.

Robb's brother Bran and his friends, having escaped the Boltons' attack on the Stark castle Winterfell, are guided north by Bran's dreams of a three-eyed crow. At the Wall, Sam guides them to Coldhands and returns to the Night Watch's headquarters at Castle Black, having sworn to keep Bran's survival secret even from Jon Snow, Bran's bastard brother and Sam's fellow Watchman.

Jon, on a mission to infiltrate the wildlings, convinces Mance that he is a deserter from the Night's Watch, and learns that the Others are driving the wildlings south towards the Wall. Jon and his captor Ygritte also begin a sexual relationship. After crossing the Wall, Jon escapes the wildlings and returns to Castle Black. The approaching wildling army attacks Castle Black; but Jon takes command of the defenses and repels several assaults, during which Ygritte is slain. After that, the Watch's surviving leaders Janos Slynt and Alliser Thorne falsely accuse Jon of treachery, and send him north of the Wall to kill Mance under a pretense of parley. As Jon is talking with Mance in the wildling camp, Stannis' army arrives, routing the Wildlings, and Mance is imprisoned. Stannis offers to legitimize Jon and make him Lord of Winterfell in exchange for his support, but Jon decides to decline Stannis' offer, and is elected by the Night's Watch as its new Lord Commander.

Slaver's Bay
Daenerys Targaryen learns that large slave armies can be bought in Astapor, one of the cities of Slaver's Bay, and buys the entire host of the warrior-eunuch Unsullied by offering one of her infant dragons in exchange. Upon payment, Daenerys orders the Unsullied and the dragon to turn on the slave traders and sack the city. With the help of her maturing dragons, she frees all the slaves of Astapor, including the Unsullied. Daenerys' army then conquers the slaver city of Yunkai; but the lords of the neighbouring city of Meereen antagonize Daenerys by killing child slaves and burning the land to deny her resources. Consequently, Daenerys besieges the city to no avail.

Daenerys discovers two traitors in her camp: Ser Jorah Mormont, who had spied on her for the late King Robert, and Ser Barristan Selmy, the humiliated former Lord Commander of King Robert's Kingsguard. Daenerys offers both men the chance to make amends by sneaking into Meereen to free the slaves and start an uprising. Meereen soon falls and, in retaliation for the murdered child slaves, Daenerys has the city's rulers put to death. Selmy asks for Daenerys' forgiveness and becomes Lord Commander of her Queensguard, while Jorah, who refuses to admit any wrongdoing, is banished. When Daenerys learns that the council she left to govern Astapor has been overthrown, she decides to remain in Meereen to rule it herself.

Characters
The tale is told through the eyes of ten main characters, plus a one-off prologue POV and a one-off epilogue POV character, for a total of 12 narrators.
 Prologue: Chett, a brother and hound-keeper of the Night's Watch
 Jaime Lannister, the Kingslayer, and the Lord Commander of the Kingsguard. Imprisoned by the Starks.
 Jon Snow, bastard son of Eddard Stark, a sworn brother of the Night's Watch
 Catelyn Stark, of House Tully, widow of Lord Eddard Stark, mother of Robb Stark
 Tyrion Lannister, youngest son of Tywin Lannister, a dwarf, brother of Jaime and Cersei Lannister
 Sansa Stark, eldest daughter of Eddard and Catelyn Stark
 Arya Stark, youngest daughter of Eddard and Catelyn Stark
 Bran Stark, son of Eddard and Catelyn Stark, heir to Winterfell and the North
 Samwell Tarly, cowardly son of Lord Randyll Tarly, a sworn brother of the Night's Watch
 Davos Seaworth, a smuggler turned knight in the service of King Stannis Baratheon
 Daenerys Targaryen, exiled Queen of Westeros, of the Targaryen dynasty
 Epilogue: Merrett Frey, a member of the numerous Frey family.

Development
On October 6, 2009, Martin noted on his blog that his manuscript for A Storm of Swords had been 1521 pages in length; the initial printed hardcover came in at 992 pages. Martin did not write the Red Wedding chapters until he had completed every other chapter of the book, as he felt it was "the hardest thing I ever wrote" and that he would rather delay writing until absolutely necessary. In contrast, he referred to the chapter of Joffrey's fatal wedding as "easy and fun to write" but that he nevertheless tried to instill empathy for the painful demise of this very unpopular character and "bring home the point that this, too, was a human being who was scared and terrified and then dead".

Editions
Foreign language editions
 Bulgarian: Бард: "Вихър от Мечове"
 Catalan: Alfaguara: "Tempesta d'espases" "Storm of swords"
 Chinese: 重庆出版社(2007): "冰雨的风暴" ("Storm of Freezing Rain").
 Czech: Talpress: "Bouře mečů" ("Storm of Swords")
 Danish: Gyldendal: "En Storm af Sværd" ("A Storm of Swords")
 Dutch: Luitingh-Sijthoff: "Een storm van zwaarden" ("A Storm of Swords")
 Estonian: Two volumes, hardcover, Varrak (2010, 2011): "Mõõkade maru. Teras ja lumi" (A Storm of Swords: Steel and Snow"), "Mõõkade maru. Veri ja kuld" ("A Storm of Swords: Blood and Gold")
 Finnish: Kirjava: "Miekkamyrsky" ("Swordstorm")
 French: Four volumes (Hardcover: Pygmalion (2001, 2002, 2003); paperback: J'ai Lu (2003, 2004)): "Les brigands" (hardcover) / "Intrigues à Port-Réal" (paperback), "L'épée de feu", "Les Noces Pourpres", "La loi du Régicide" ("The robbers/Intrigues in King's Landing", "The sword of fire", "The Red Wedding", "The law of the kingslayer".)
 German: Single volume, Fantasy Productions (2005): "Schwertgewitter" ("Sword Storm"). Two volumes, Blanvalet (2001, 2002): "Sturm der Schwerter", "Die Königin der Drachen" ("Storm of Swords", "The Queen of Dragons").
 Greek: Two volumes, Anubis: "Παγωμένες Λεπίδες", "Ματωμένο Χρυσάφι" ("Frozen Blades","Bloody Gold")
 Hebrew: "סופת החרבות חלק א - פלדה ושלג, סופת החרבות חלק ב - דם וזהב" ("Storm of swords - Steel and snow","Storm of swords - blood and gold")
 Hungarian: Alexandra Könyvkiadó: "Kardok vihara" ("Storm of Swords")
 Indonesian: Fantasious: "Amukan Baja" ("Steel's Fury")
 Italian: Three volumes, Arnoldo Mondadori Editore (2002, 2003, 2004): "Tempesta di spade", "I fiumi della guerra", "Il Portale delle Tenebre" ("A Storm of Swords", "The Rivers of War", "The Gate of Darkness").
 Japanese: Three volumes, hardcover : Hayakawa (2006-7), paperback : Hayakawa (2012): "剣嵐の大地" ("The Land of the Sword Storm") I, II and III
 Korean: Eun Haeng Namu Publishing Co. : "성검의 폭풍" ("Storm of Holy Swords")
 Lithuanian: Alma Littera "Kardų audra" ("A Storm of Swords").
 Norwegian: Two volumes, Vendetta (2013): "Stål og snø: en sang om is og ild, bok 3, del 1", "Blod og Gull: en sang om is og ild, bok 3, del 2" ("Steel and Snow: A Song of Ice and Fire, book 3, part 1, Blood and Gold: A Song of Ice and Fire, book 3, part 2)"
 Polish: Two volumes, Zysk i S-ka: "Nawałnica mieczy:Stal i Śnieg (I)", "Nawałnica mieczy: Krew i Złoto(II)" (A Storm of Swords: Steel and Snow", "A Storm of Swords: Blood and Gold")
 Brazilian Portuguese: Leya: "A Tormenta de Espadas" ("The Storm of Swords")
 European Portuguese: Two Volumes, Saída de Emergência: "A Tormenta de Espadas" ("A Storm of Swords"), "A Glória dos Traidores" ("The Betrayer's Glory")
 Romanian: Nemira: "Iureșul săbiilor"
 Russian: AST: "Буря мечей" ("Storm of Swords").
 Serbian: Two volumes, Лагуна: "Олуја мачева Део први: Челик и снег"(A Storm of Swords First part: "Steel and snow"), "Олуја мачева Део други: Крв и Злато" (A Storm of Swords Second part: "Blood and Gold" )
 Slovakia: Two volumes, Tatran: "Búrka mečov 1: Oceľ a sneh", "Búrka mečov 2: Krv a zlato" ("A Storm of Swords Part I: Steel and snow", "A Storm of Swords Part II: Blood and Gold")
 Slovenian: Vihra mečev ("A Storm of Swords")
 Spanish: Two volumes, Gilgamesh (2005): "Tormenta de espadas I", "Tormenta de espadas II" ("Storm of Swords I", "Storm of Swords II").
 Swedish: Forum: "Svärdets makt" ("The Might of the Sword")
 Turkish: Two volumes, Epsilon Yayınevi: "Buz ve Ateşin Şarkısı III: Kılıçların Fırtınası - Kısım I & Kılıçların Fırtınası - Kısım II" ("A Storm of Swords")
 Ukrainian: KM Publishing (2015): "Буря мечів" ("A Storm of Swords")
 Vietnamese: Three Volumes: "Trò Chơi Vương Quyền 3A: Sự trở lại của Ngoại nhân", "Trò Chơi Vương Quyền 3B: Nước mắt Sói Tuyết", "Trò Chơi Vương Quyền 3C: Tử Hôn". ("Game of Thrones 3A: Return of the Others", "Game of Thrones 3B: Tears of Direwolf", "Game of Thrones 3C: Purple Wedding")

Reception

Publishers Weekly said the third volume was "one of the more rewarding examples of gigantism in contemporary fantasy. [...] The complexity of characters such as Daenerys, Arya and the Kingslayer will keep readers turning even the vast number of pages contained in this volume, for the author, like Tolkien or Jordan, makes us care about their fates. Those two fantasy greats are also evoked by Martin's ability to convey such sensual experiences as the heat of wildfire, the chill of ice, the smell of the sea and the sheer gargantuan indigestibility of the medieval banquet at its most excessive. Perhaps this saga doesn't go as far beyond the previous bounds of high fantasy as some claim, but for most readers it certainly goes far enough to command their attention."

Martin was nominated for the 2001 Hugo Award for Best Novel, but lost to J. K. Rowling for Harry Potter and the Goblet of Fire. Afterwards he made this comment about his fans: "Eat your heart out, Rowling. Maybe you have billions of dollars and my Hugo, but you don't have readers like these."

Awards and nominations
 Hugo Award – Best Novel (Nominated) – (2001)
 Locus Award – Best Novel (Fantasy) (Won) – (2001)
 Nebula Award – Best Novel (Nominated) – (2001)
 Geffen Award – Best Fantasy Book (Won) – (2002)
 Ignotus Award – Best Novel (Foreign) (Won) – (2006)

References

External links
 A Wiki Of Ice And Fire Wiki dedicated to A Song of Ice and Fire
 
 
 A Storm of Swords at Worlds Without End
The Real Red Wedding at TheVintageNews.com
The Real Red Wedding at FactBehindFiction.com
The Real Red Wedding at DenOfGeek.com

2000 American novels
A Song of Ice and Fire books
American fantasy novels
Novels by George R. R. Martin
2000 fantasy novels
HarperCollins books
Novels about mass murder
Patricide in fiction
Fiction about regicide
Uxoricide in fiction